There are 52 municipalities in Lycoming County, Pennsylvania. Under Pennsylvania law, there are three types of incorporated municipalities in Lycoming County: cities, boroughs and townships. Any municipality in Pennsylvania with more than 10 persons can incorporate as a borough. Any township or borough with a population of at least 10,000 can ask the state legislature to become chartered as a city. There are no unincorporated areas in the county, since all territory in Pennsylvania is incorporated.

The 52 incorporated municipalities in Lycoming County are the subject of the first list, which gives their names and etymologies, dates settled and incorporated, what they were formed from, area, population, and location within the county. Two other lists dealing with former parts of Lycoming County are included. The second list is of former incorporated townships and gives the same information as above on their current status. The third list gives information on the eighteen other Pennsylvania counties which were formed from or contain land originally in the county.

In the 2000 census, the population of Lycoming County was 120,044, making it a "Fifth Class County" (defined by Pennsylvania law as "having a population of 95,000 and more, but less than 145,000 inhabitants"). It is included in the Williamsport, Pennsylvania metropolitan statistical area, whose  county seat is Williamsport. Lycoming County is located in north central Pennsylvania, about 130 miles (209 km) northwest of Philadelphia and 165 miles (266 km) east-northeast of Pittsburgh, as the crow flies.

Municipalities

As of 2012, Lycoming County has 52 incorporated municipalities: one city, nine boroughs, and 42 townships. Lycoming County's townships include one census-designated place (CDP) and 50 villages. CDPs are geographical areas designated by the U.S. Census Bureau for the purposes of compiling demographic data. Villages are marked with signs by the Pennsylvania Department of Transportation. Neither CDPs nor villages are actual jurisdictions under Pennsylvania law and their territory is legally part of the township(s) where they are located. The first list also notes the CDP and villages within their respective townships.

At  as of 2012, Lycoming County is the largest county by land area in Pennsylvania. While Erie County is larger, nearly half of its area is in Lake Erie. The city of Williamsport has the highest population of any municipality (30,706 or 25.6% of the county total as of 2000), while Brown Township in the northwest corner of the county has the lowest population (111 or 0.092%). Most of the county's population is in the valley along the West Branch Susquehanna River.

Former townships

The territory which today makes up Lycoming County was purchased from the Iroquois in two treaties signed at Fort Stanwix in New York: the first treaty was in 1768, and the second treaty was in 1784. The county was formed on April 13, 1795 from part of Northumberland County. The county originally contained seven townships when formed: Lower Bald Eagle, Loyalsock, Lycoming, Muncy, Nippenose, Pine Creek, and Washington. Today Pine Creek is part of Clinton County and Lower Bald Eagle is part of both Centre and Clinton counties, but the rest are still in Lycoming County, although many other municipalities have been formed from these since.

When originally formed in 1795, Lycoming County was "roughly estimated at about 12,000 square miles" (31,000 km2). Its territory stretched north to the New York state line, west to the Allegheny River, south nearly to the source of the West Branch Susquehanna River, and east to include modern Sullivan County and a bit beyond. However, by 1800, just five years after its formation, the first territory was taken from it to form new counties, a process that continued until 1847.

Twenty other Pennsylvania counties today contain land that was once part of Lycoming County: five were formed completely from it (Jefferson, McKean, Potter, Tioga, and Sullivan), eight were formed from it and other counties (Armstrong, Bradford, Centre, Clearfield, Clinton, Indiana, Venango, and Warren), three were formed from counties that were themselves formed partly from it (Cameron, Clarion, and Elk), Forest was formed from a county that was formed completely from it, two (Luzerne and Wyoming) contain territory that was part of lycoming County in 1795, and finally Union received a township from it in 1861.

The second table lists each of the twenty two known former incorporated areas in the county, and information on the modern township successors of these today. Note that former townships are only known for nine of the twenty counties containing land from Lycoming.

Clickable map
The map shown below is clickable; click on any municipality label to be redirected to the article for that city, borough or township.

See also
 History of Lycoming County, Pennsylvania
 List of villages in Lycoming County, Pennsylvania

Notes

a. Bald Eagle Township was formed in 1772 as one of the seven original townships in Northumberland County (Muncy Township is the only other of the seven which is now part of Lycoming County). In August 1785, Washington Township was formed from Bald Eagle, and in November 1785 parts of Bald Eagle Township were added to the newly formed Lycoming and Pine Creek townships (the bulk of their territory had been purchased from the Iroquois in 1784). In May 1786, Bald Eagle Township was split into three new townships: Nippenose, Upper Bald Eagle, and Lower Bald Eagle. In 1789, Mifflin County was formed from Upper Bald Eagle Township and half of Potter Township (itself formed partly from the original Bald Eagle Township in May 1774). When Lycoming County was formed in 1795, Lower Bald Eagle was one of the original seven townships. Centre County was formed in 1800 from parts of Huntingdon, Lycoming, Mifflin, and Northumberland counties. Centre County originally had eight townships, with two (Lower Bald Eagle and Upper Bald Eagle), taken from Lycoming County. It is not clear if this Upper Bald Eagle was a newly formed township, or some portion of the original not taken when Mifflin County was formed.|| Some territory from Lower Bald Eagle Township remained in Lycoming County. In 1801, Centre County renamed "Upper Bald Eagle Township" as "Spring Township" and "Lower Bald Eagle Township" as "Bald Eagle Township". In 1839 Clinton County was formed from Centre and Lycoming counties, with Bald Eagle Township as one of three taken from Centre County. Today neither Centre nor Lycoming counties have a township named "Bald Eagle".

b. According to Meginness (Chapter 14), Wayne Township was formed from Nippenose Township in 1798, while part of Lycoming County. Note that the PHMC sheet on Clinton County incorrectly says it was formed as part of Northumberland County, but neither the Lycoming nor Northumberland County histories support this. When Clinton County was formed in 1839, there were 12 original townships. It "embraced the following townships then in Centre County, viz., Bald Eagle, Lamar, and Logan; and from Lycoming, Allison, Chapman, Colebrook, Dunstable, Grove, Lumber, Limestone, Pine Creek, and Wayne." Since Lamar was formed from Bald Eagle, 11 of the 12 original townships came at least indirectly from Lycoming County. Limestone was split from the Lycoming County township of the same name, then attached to Wayne Township, and renamed Crawford Township when it was reformed. Grove and Lumber townships became part of Cameron County, but the remaining ten townships are still in Clinton County.

c. When originally formed in 1803, Shrewsbury Township encompassed all of modern Sullivan County. Elkland Township was formed from Shrewsbury in 1804, as were Cherry (1824), Davidson and Forks Townships (both 1833). Plunketts Creek Township was formed from Franklin and Davidson Townships in 1838, and Fox Township was formed from Elkland in 1839. When Sullivan County was formed in 1847, both Shrewsbury and Plunketts Creek Townships were split, with each county originally having a township of that name (Plunketts Creek Township in Sullivan County changed its name to Hillsgrove Township in 1856).

References
Unless otherwise noted, all information on area and population comes from the U.S. Census Bureau.

External links

  Official Lycoming County Website
 

Lycoming County
Lycoming County